Zeineba Yimer (born 17 June 1998) is an Ethiopian long-distance runner. She represented Ethiopia at the 2019 African Games in Rabat, Morocco and won the silver medal in the women's 10,000 metres event.

Career
In 2017, Zeineba Yimer won the Great Ethiopian Run held in Addis Ababa, Ethiopia.

She finished in fifth place at the 2018 IAAF World Half Marathon Championships in Valencia, Spain. In the team event Yimer, Netsanet Gudeta and Meseret Belete won the gold medal with a combined time of 3:22:27. In 2020, she competed in the women's half marathon at the 2020 World Athletics Half Marathon Championships held in Gdynia, Poland.

Yimer competed in the women's marathon at the delayed 2020 Tokyo Olympics.

Achievements

References

External links
 

Living people
1998 births
Place of birth missing (living people)
Ethiopian female long-distance runners
African Games silver medalists for Ethiopia
African Games medalists in athletics (track and field)
Athletes (track and field) at the 2019 African Games
Athletes (track and field) at the 2020 Summer Olympics
Olympic athletes of Ethiopia
Olympic female marathon runners
21st-century Ethiopian women